Michael Philip Des Barres (born 24 January 1948), the 26th Marquis Des Barres, is an English actor and rock singer. He appeared as Murdoc in the original MacGyver, Murdoc's mentor Nicholas Helman in MacGyver (2016) and replaced Robert Palmer in the band The Power Station, fronting the band at the 1985 Live Aid concert.

Early life
The only child of Marquis Philip and Marquise Irene Des Barres, Michael Philip Des Barres was born and brought up in Hove, Sussex. He attended Repton School, a boarding school in Derbyshire, and went on to attend the Corona Academy drama school in London and appeared in several plays. He has some French ancestry. His title of Marquis was bestowed upon a 13th-century ancestor Guillaume II Des Barres, a French knight. Guillaume II Des Barres was bestowed the title of Marquis after rescuing the king Philip II of France during the Battle of Bouvines in 1214.

Career

Music
Des Barres started his musical career in the glam rock band Silverhead in England in 1972. The group released two albums on Deep Purple's record label Purple Records before breaking up in 1974.

After leaving Silverhead, Des Barres moved to Los Angeles, where he formed the band Detective. The band was signed to Led Zeppelin's Swan Song Records label by Jimmy Page, whom Des Barres had met after a Silverhead performance in Birmingham, England, that the members of Led Zeppelin had attended.

Following the break-up of Detective in 1978, Des Barres formed Chequered Past in 1982. In 1983 he co-wrote and recorded the song "Obsession" with Holly Knight. In 1984, the band Animotion had an international top-ten hit with their cover.

Des Barres met the members of Duran Duran when Chequered Past opened for a few shows during their 1984 tour. In 1985, when Robert Palmer withdrew from the Duran Duran side project Power Station just before their American summer tour, Des Barres was chosen to take his place as lead vocalist.

On 5 November 2013, The Michael Des Barres Band released a live album, Hot n Sticky Live, which was recorded at the Viper Room in Los Angeles in November 2012. The album is available as high quality mp3 downloads.

On 7 April 2015 Des Barres released a solo album, The Key to the Universe. Produced by Bob Rose at The Forum Music Village in Rome, the album reunited Des Barres with Nigel Harrison (former bassist of Blondie and Silverhead) on bass and guitar, in addition to Clive Deamer (Radiohead, Portishead, Robert Plant) on drums, and Dani Robinson on guitar.

In 2018, he formed The Mistakes, consisting of all veteran musicians – Loren Molinare (founding member of Little Caesar & The Dogs) on guitar, Eric Himel (Powerman 5000, host of The Sunset Jam) on guitar, Paul Ill (LA-based musician with sales of over 20 million records as a studio musician and 4.5 million records as a songwriter) on bass guitar, and Matt Starr (studio and touring drummer with Guns N' Roses, Ace Frehley, Bon Jovi & Whitesnake) on drums.  The band is signed to Steven Van Zant's Wicked Cool Records and has released 4 songs – "Living in the USA"/"Gotta Serve Somebody" (1/19/18) and "Crackle and Hiss"/"Stop in the Name of Love" (7/5/19). The Mistakes' plans to tour Japan and Russia in 2020 were cancelled because of the worldwide COVID-19 pandemic.

Acting
Des Barres has appeared in over 100 different TV shows and almost 30 movies in his career. He first started acting at 8 years old as 'The Nux Bar Kid' on posters all over England. He appeared (uncredited) in the 1966 film starring Tony Curtis, Drop Dead Darling. His first credited film role was as a supporting cast member in the classic 1967 film To Sir, with Love, playing an East End pupil who always wears dark sunglasses indoors and out, followed by a few other minor roles before he decided to pursue a career in music instead. He later concentrated his energies on acting again and was cast in Ghoulies (1985) as cult leader Malcolm Graves, and Nightflyers (1987) as a charismatic empath. He worked opposite Clint Eastwood in 1989's Pink Cadillac. His other film roles have included Midnight Cabaret (1990), Under Siege (1992), Waxwork II: Lost in Time (1992), A Simple Twist of Fate (1994), and Sugar Town (1999). He also appeared in the 2004 film Catch That Kid and had a brief part in David Lynch's classic 2001 film Mulholland Drive.

On television, besides the role of Murdoc in MacGyver, Des Barres was also a lead cast member of The New WKRP in Cincinnati during the 1991–92 season, as part of a husband-and-wife morning team. He had previously appeared on the original WKRP in Cincinnati as the lead singer of a punk band, Scum of the Earth. On Roseanne he portrayed (Leon's boyfriend) as well as appearing as one of Darlene's baby's doctors on one of the final episodes of the series. Some of his dozens of television appearances include Seinfeld, Renegade,  ALF, Ellen, Nip/Tuck, Just Shoot Me!, Hart To Hart, My Sister Sam, Lois & Clark which reunited him with another MacGyver recurring-character alumna, Teri Hatcher, JAG, Melrose Place, Nash Bridges, Northern Exposure, Rockford Files, Sledge Hammer!, Sliders, St. Elsewhere, 21 Jump Street, The Pretender, Dead Like Me, Frasier, Hawaii, Bones, and NCIS in the Season 10 episode "Phoenix".

On 23 October 2013, Des Barres joined the Los Angeles Philharmonic for the world premiere of 200 Motels: The Suites, by Frank Zappa, in which he appeared as Rance, the narrator.

Radio
Currently, Des Barres hosts "The Michael Des Barres Program" every weekday morning from 8–11 AM ET with a replay every weekday evening from 9- midnight PT on Little Steven's Underground Garage (SiriusXM Channel 21). Over six million listeners hear an eclectic mix of rock, soul and punk, infused with Des Barres' extensive musical knowledge and his messages of positivity and longevity.

Documentary: "Michael Des Barres: Who Do You Want Me To Be"
In 2021, Des Barres released the documentary "Who Do You Want Me To Be," directed by J. Elvis Weinstein, on streaming platforms plus DVD and Blu-ray. The tag line for the film is "The son of a junkie aristocrat and a schizophrenic showgirl becomes a master of reinvention on a 50+ year journey through rock and roll, TV, and movies."

Personal life
In 1974, Des Barres married his girlfriend of seven years, actress Wendy Hamilton (Professor Emeritus Wendy Wheeler, London Metropolitan University). They divorced when Michael moved to Los Angeles following the disbandment of Silverhead.

Des Barres was married to Pamela Des Barres from 1977 until 1991. They have a son, Nicholas Des Barres, a successful writer and video game designer.

Des Barres has been sober since June 1981. In the mid-1980s he was one of the founding members of Rock Against Drugs. He later did volunteer addiction counseling and worked with homeless teens. Des Barres has also organised and hosted the annual Don't Knock the Rock Film Festival, which first took place in 2003.

Des Barres married his long-term partner, Britta Hayertz on December 21, 2018. Hayertz is the owner of Britta Morgan Pilates.

Discography

Studio albums
 I'm Only Human (1980)
 Somebody Up There Likes Me (1986)
 The Key to the Universe (2015)

with Silverhead
 Silverhead (1972)
 16 and Savaged (1973)
 Live at the Rainbow (1975)

with Detective
 Detective (1977)
 It Takes One to Know One (1977)
 Live from the Atlantic Studios (1978)

with Chequered Past
 Chequered Past (1984)

with The Michael Des Barres Band
 Carnaby Street (2012)
 Hot n Sticky Live (2013)

Filmography

Film

Television

Music videos

References

External links

 Official website
 
 

1948 births
Blues rock musicians
Living people
English expatriates in the United States
English male singer-songwriters
English male film actors
English people of French descent
English rock singers
English pop singers
The Power Station (band) members